Tibor Balajcza (born 24 January 1937) is a Hungarian racewalker. He competed in the men's 20 kilometres walk at the 1960 Summer Olympics.

References

1937 births
Living people
Athletes (track and field) at the 1960 Summer Olympics
Hungarian male racewalkers
Olympic athletes of Hungary
Place of birth missing (living people)